Bridgeton may refer to:

Scotland 
Bridgeton, Glasgow

South Africa 
Bridgeton, Western Cape

United States 

Bridgeton, Indiana
Bridgeton Township, Michigan
Bridgeton, Missouri
Bridgeton, North Carolina
Bridgeton, New Jersey
Bridgeton, Portland, Oregon, a neighborhood in Portland, Oregon
Bridgeton Township, Pennsylvania

See also
Bridgton (disambiguation)
Bridgetown (disambiguation)
MV Bridgeton
Bridgerton